François Vergucht (born 1887, date of death unknown) was a Belgian rower who won a silver medal in men's eight at the 1908 Summer Olympics.

References

Belgian male rowers
Olympic rowers of Belgium
Olympic silver medalists for Belgium
Rowers at the 1908 Summer Olympics
Olympic medalists in rowing
1887 births
Year of death missing
Royal Club Nautique de Gand rowers
Medalists at the 1908 Summer Olympics
European Rowing Championships medalists
20th-century Belgian people